Education in El Salvador follows a (1 or 2) 9-2-5 educational system, which is regulated by the country's Ministry of Education:

The Human Rights Measurement Initiative (HRMI) finds that El Salvador is fulfilling only 64.8% of what it should be fulfilling for the right to education based on the country's level of income. HRMI breaks down the right to education by looking at the rights to both primary education and secondary education. While taking into consideration El Salvador's income level, the nation is achieving 64.5% of what should be possible based on its resources (income) for primary education and 65.2% for secondary education.

Education levels 
 One or two years of Preschool Education (called kinder, short for kindergarten), which is not part of the State's educational system.
 Nine years of Basic Education divided into three cycles of three grades each:
 1st Cycle: from 1st to 3rd grades
 2nd Cycle: from 4th to 6th grades
 3rd Cycle: from 7th to 9th grades; which is a transition to secondary education (e.g. specialized teachers for each assignment).
 Two (or an optional three years technical program) of Middle Education, called bachillerato:
 Two year General High School
 Three year Technical High School (e.g. Accounting, Secretariat, Electronics and Computer Science, etc.)
 Five years (minimum) of Higher Education, consisting of university education or other tertiary education.

Current education situation and statistics 
According to statistics, only 82% of children make it to 9th grade. 6% of the children in El Salvador, do not attend school at all. Children who have finished 9th grade can go to secondary school, but only 33% will. The distribution of literacy is 79% men and 73% women.

According to the El Salvador Constitution (1983), every child is entitled to free education at the age of 4–6 years. Since most families live from less than $1 a day, it is normal in El Salvador that children under the age of 7 drop out of school to support their parents by working on a coffee plantation or helping in the household, because the parents can not afford education for the children. About 1.8 million minors between the ages of 5 and 17 work. In rural areas, about 62% of all children work, to support their families.

Complications and improvement 
The Minister of Education is responsible for education in El Salvador. Former President, Salvador Sánchez Cerén, who used to be a primary school teacher, co-supervised the Education Department from 2009 to 2012. The improvement of the Salvadoran school and university system is in need of improvement compared to other Latin American countries.

The biggest problem is the elementary and middle school education. Although the government creates incentives through teaching materials, distribution of school uniforms and free meals in schools, El Salvador still remains in the rear in terms of education. Strong deficits are the condition of the different schools, the schools themselves are underfunded. Teachers’ wages are too low and according to recent research, 3,000 schools in 262 communities are in need of repair. The current president announced an increase in the education budget from 3% to 6% by the end of his term in office (2019), but instead, the education budget has been cut.

In the meantime, 88% of the population is dominated by reading and writing, which is a great step forward. In 1992, after the end of the civil war, only 74% of them knew how to read and write. Spanish is spoken in El Salvador and English dominates as the first foreign language.
In 1992 the Minister of Education Cecilia Gallardo de Cano embarked on a reform program of basic education. In 2017, the literacy rate was 88% for adults who were 15 years old and above.

The national educational system is not the only one available. Pre-university education is not free. The State provides public education for which a fee is paid if the person paying can afford it and only one payment per family is made (i.e. siblings pay only one fee). Public education is inconsistent in quality, being extremely poor in rural areas and dubiously efficient in urban areas, becoming one of the State's greatest challenges.

The private schools have also made progress in El Salvador, there are also German, French, British and US schools in El Salvador, which offer a recognized high level of education.

According to the World Bank, access to primary education in El Salvador has increased in recent years, as mentioned earlier, the literacy rate has also increased. Mainly the urban areas have developed. Nevertheless, a big challenge remains the early school leavers.

Impact of education on poverty 
The average income in El Salvador is approximately 851$, about 40% of the population live below the poverty line. At the moment, efforts are being made to reduce unemployment by boosting economic growth.

Due to poverty, many young people tend to violence, which is why they put less focus on education. El Salvador is one of the most violent countries in Latin America. Between 1980 and 1992 there was a civil war, which cost more than 75,000 lives. Since 1992, more than 50,000 people have been murdered, reflecting the level of violence that has barely declined since the Civil War. 81% of the murdered were between 18 and 39 years of age, 82% of whom were men.

Another strong deficit in education is that many children are not given the opportunity to attend school. Many children have to work on sugar or coffee plantations at a young age or help in the household. As already mentioned, more than 40% of the people in El Salvador are living below the poverty line. It is common for children in poor families to start working after the age of six.

As mentioned, very few students are able to obtain a university degree. For young people and adults who have achieved little or no education, it is difficult to earn a decent salary in El Salvador. The minimum salary is $185 and people who have no secondary education need to work for less than the minimum salary.

Higher education 

The University of El Salvador (UES) is the largest (and only) public university in the country. However, classes are constantly stopped for protests. The University of El Salvador has one main campus in San Salvador and three more campuses in Santa Ana, San Miguel and San Vicente.

There are also many private universities as alternatives to UES.

In December  2014, the government of El Salvador entered into partnership with the United States Agency for International Development, in hopes of improving institutions of higher learning within the country with updated curricula and faculty training.

Curriculum and Teachers 
The curriculum of schools in El Salvador is strictly set by MINED. The General Education Law of 1996, put forth by MINED, established a national curriculum that applies to both public and private institutions. However, this law did state that teachers could make modifications that they saw as "necessary". The same general curriculum is used in schools today, but in 2007, the curriculum was extended to a competencies approach. This approach was derived from Spain and simply ensured the completion of simple and complex tasks in a determined context. Moreover, since the decentralization of the education system in 2007, schools have been encouraged to adopt their own curricula to build a unique school identity. Overall, there has been little change to the curriculum since 1996, but topics such as sex education, child safety, gender and human rights have been integrated into school systems all throughout the country. The main reason the curriculum has not had any drastic changes since the 1990's is because of the lack of resources available in schools. For example, many of the rural school districts do not have access to the state-provided textbooks. This forces teachers to improvise and stray away from the state mandated curriculum.

In El Salvador, the curriculum is divided into three specific levels: Early Childhood Education, Basic Education, and Secondary Education. Early Childhood Education is the level of education for preschool aged children. In this level of education, the focus is on child development and adjusting to different school environments. In this stage, children learn how to socialize and be a member of the classroom community. Furthermore, children at this age develop their motor, communication, and language skills. At the Basic Education level, which is meant for 6-to-14-year old's, there are two distinct cycles. The first cycle is designated for 1st to 3rd graders. In this cycle, students develop their basic literacy and math skills as well as learn about basic social and ethical values. The second cycle of the Basic Education level is designed for 4th to 6th graders. In the cycle, children are introduced to new subjects such as history, science, government and geography. Additionally, students at this age began to develop their writing skills. The next level of education is Secondary Education, which is divided into three cycles. The first cycle of this level is designed for 7th to 9th graders. In this cycle, students focus on the strengthening of their math, science, history, reading, writing and language skills. The second cycle of this level is designated for 9th the 11th graders. This cycle focuses on the development of students writing abilities, understanding of technology and social studies skills. The final cycle of this stage is strictly designed for 12th graders. The main  focus of this cycle is to prepare students for their eventual career path.

Teachers in El Salvador, while generally well trained, are affected by the struggles of the education system. In 2018, it was reported by The World Bank that 95 percent of primary school teachers were sufficiently trained. Moreover, El Salvador requires that teachers attain at least a Bachelor's Degree in Education and a teaching license from MINED. MINED also requires that teachers attend professional development courses to strengthen their teaching skills and to learn new teaching methods. However, due to the country's lack of investment in education, teachers are forced to deal with things such as lack of resources and poor infrastructure (especially in rural settings). As of 2021, education makes up approximately 18 percent of the country's total spending. While this number may seem insignificant, it does represent a steady increase in annual spending. In 2020, education only made-up 13 percent of the country's annual budget. This increase in spending may be an indication that the Salvadoran Government is continuing their trend of emphasizing the education system. Furthermore, this increase in spending represents the public desire of increasing teacher's salaries and providing them with more effective resources.

In El Salvador, teachers make roughly 4,900 dollars (USD) per year, which amounts to about 43,000 dollars in Salvadoran currency. Much like in the United States, this places teachers in the middle class of society. Also like the United States, this disincentives people to become educators. Furthermore, the people who do decide become educators do not want to invest their hard-earned money in materials and resources for their classroom's. Due to the relatively low wages and fear of job security, teacher unions were founded in El Salvador during the 1960's and 70's. In fact, in February 2022, over 20 teachers' unions protested in San Salvador. The protest was centered around pension reform, wages and healthcare coverage.

References

External links 
 La Educación en El Salvador 
 Ministerio de Educación. El Salvador 
 Basic Education Facts about El Salvador
 Dropot Rates in El Salavor (In Spanish)

 
Society of El Salvador